Ivano Corghi (14 September 1922 – 4 March 2006) was an Italian football goalkeeper and later manager.

References

1922 births
2006 deaths
Italian footballers
Palermo F.C. players
Modena F.C. 2018 players
Novara F.C. players
Serie A players
Association football goalkeepers
Italian football managers
Novara F.C. managers
Modena F.C. managers
Piacenza Calcio 1919 managers
A.C. Carpi managers
Parma Calcio 1913 managers
Frosinone Calcio managers
F.C. Grosseto S.S.D. managers